On 17 July 1975 the South Armagh Brigade of the Provisional Irish Republican Army (IRA) detonated an improvised bomb inside a beer keg when it was being investigated by British Army soldiers. Four soldiers were killed and another seriously injured. This was the first major breach in the truce negotiated by the IRA and British government in February 1975. The attack took place in Forkhill, County Armagh. It was one of many such attacks by the IRA in the 1970s.

Attack
On 17 July 1975, Major Peter Willis, the Green Howards company commander in Crossmaglen was accompanied by three British soldiers, all of whom were bomb disposal experts. They were investigating a milk churn at Cortreasla Bridge in Tullydonnell. They walked through a gap in a hedge beside a signpost. As they did so, a 70 lb bomb that had been packed into a beer keg and buried in the ground, was detonated by command wire from about 400 yards away. Four soldiers were killed outright with another injured by shrapnel. 

The soldiers killed were Major Peter Willis (37), Edward Garside (34), Robert McCarter (33) and Calvert Brown (25). They were the first British soldiers to be killed by the IRA since the February truce.

Aftermath
The IRA claimed in a statement that the attack had been retaliation for the killing of two IRA members. British Secretary of State for Northern Ireland, Merlyn Rees, condemned those responsible for the killings.

IRA member Pat Thompson was convicted of the attack in March 1976. Thompson signed a statement saying that the Crossmaglen IRA unit planned and carried out the attack. Thompson maintains, however, that he was forced to sign the statement after receiving beatings and threats to his family. Thompson was not released until 1991, serving 15 years.

See also
Chronology of Provisional Irish Republican Army actions (1970–1979)
Ballygawley land mine attack
Altnaveigh landmine attack
Dungannon land mine attack

External links
Brian Walker reports from the scene of yesterday's IRA booby-trap explosion at Forkhill which killed four soldiers: Interview with Col. Peter Ing.

References

Explosions in 1975
1975 in Northern Ireland
July 1975 events in the United Kingdom
British Army in Operation Banner
Improvised explosive device bombings in Northern Ireland
Military actions and engagements during the Troubles (Northern Ireland)
Military history of County Armagh
Provisional Irish Republican Army actions
The Troubles in County Armagh